Daniel Shulman (born 2 October 1966) is an American performer; playing bass guitar. Although he has made a significant contribution as a session musician, working with Run-DMC and Meredith Brooks, he is best known for his work with the Scottish-American band Garbage from 1995 until 2002.

Shulman was born in Los Angeles on October 2, 1966. He was also raised in Los Angeles. His brother, Lyor Cohen, is a notable music industry executive. Daniel currently plays with Halloween Jack. He learned to play the guitar as a boy, and picked up the bass after that.  Although he is left-handed, he plays right-handed, to mimic famous guitar players.

Background
He played bass on many Garbage tracks including songs from their Version 2.0 and Beautifulgarbage albums. He was their bassist playing live shows in support of their first three album releases.  The first Garbage song he played bass on was "Trip My Wire," and the only co-writer credit he had with the group was for the 1999 B-side "Get Busy with the Fizzy". He also played bass on "Tell Me Where it Hurts," the lead single of the band's 2007 greatest hits album Absolute Garbage, and on "This City Will Kill You", the closing song on their 2021 album No Gods No Masters.

Daniel is Eric Avery's replacement for Live Garbage shows when Eric cant fullfil his commitment.

In 2003, he left the group to work in the A & R department at Island/Def Jam Records.

External links 
 
 Daniel Shulman at MySpace

References 

1966 births
Living people
American people of Canadian descent
American people of Israeli descent
Guitarists from Los Angeles
American male bass guitarists
20th-century American bass guitarists
20th-century American male musicians